Yuliya Lobzhenidze (born 23 August 1977) is a Ukrainian and Georgian archer. She competed in the archery competition at the 2016 Summer Olympics, where she finished 57th out of 64 competitors in the individual competition and, along with Kristine Esebua and Khatuna Narimanidze, 12th out of 12 teams in the team competition.

References

External links
 

Living people
1977 births
Ukrainian female archers
Female archers from Georgia (country)
Olympic archers of Georgia (country)
Archers at the 2016 Summer Olympics
Archers at the 2015 European Games
European Games competitors for Georgia (country)